Central Magdalena Province is one of the 15 provinces in the Cundinamarca Department, Colombia. Central Magdalena borders to the west the Tolima Department and the Magdalena River, to the north the Lower Magdalena Province, to the east the Gualivá and Tequendama Provinces and to the south the Upper Magdalena Province.

Central Magdalena Province contains seven municipalities:
 Beltrán
 Bituima
 Chaguaní
 Guayabal de Síquima
 Pulí
 San Juan de Rioseco
 Vianí

References

External links 
  Central Magdalena Province in Cundinamarca

Provinces of Cundinamarca Department